James T. Kelley (10 July 1854 – 12 November 1933) was an Irish-born American silent film actor.

Biography
Kelley was born on 10 July 1854 in Castlebar, Co. Mayo, Ireland. Kelley acted with Charlie Chaplin at Essanay Studios in Los Angeles from 1915, and continued with him at Mutual. His later work included Universal and Hal Roach.

Kelley died on 12 November 1933 in Los Angeles, California.

Partial filmography
 Street Fakers (1915)
 A Night in the Show (1915)
 Police (1916)
 The Floorwalker (1916)
 The Fireman (1916)
 The Vagabond (1916)
 The Count (1916)
 The Pawnshop (1916)
 The Rink (1916)
 Easy Street (1917)
 The Cure (1917)
 A Dog's Life (1918)
 Triple Trouble (1918)
 Never Touched Me (1919)
 An Eastern Westerner (1920)
 Among Those Present (1921)
 Cyclone Bliss (1921)
 Thundering Hoofs (1922)
 Hot Sands (1924)
 Near Dublin (1924)
 The Business of Love (1925)

References

External links

1854 births
1933 deaths
Irish male silent film actors
American male silent film actors
20th-century American male actors
Actors from County Mayo
Irish emigrants to the United States (before 1923)